was a private women's junior college in Setagaya, Tokyo, Japan. The precursor of the school was founded in 1938, and it was chartered as a junior college in 1956. 

External links 
  in Japanese

Private universities and colleges in Japan
Educational institutions established in 1938
Universities and colleges in Tokyo
Japanese junior colleges
1938 establishments in Japan